Boris Becker was the defending champion but did not compete that year.

John McEnroe won in the final 6–3, 6–3, 7–6 against Brad Gilbert.

The finals were held in Dallas, Texas at Reunion Arena.

Seeds
A champion seed is indicated in bold text while text in italics indicates the round in which that seed was eliminated.

Draw

References
1989 WCT Finals Draw (Archived 2009-05-08)

Singles